Waging War may refer to:

Waging War (album), a 2002 album by the band Swift
"Waging War" (song), a 2008 song by CeCe Winans
 "Waging War", a song by Hellyeah from their eponymous album
Waging War: The Clash Between Presidents and Congress, 1776 to ISIS, a 2016 book by David Jeremiah Barron